Herbert Memelink (born 3 May 1961) is a Dutch sports shooter. He competed in the men's 10 metre air rifle event at the 1984 Summer Olympics.

References

External links
 

1961 births
Living people
Dutch male sport shooters
Olympic shooters of the Netherlands
Shooters at the 1984 Summer Olympics
Sportspeople from Hengelo